Neolamprologus fasciatus is a species of cichlid endemic to Lake Tanganyika.  This species spawns in empty snail shells. This species can reach a length of  TL.  This species can also be found in the aquarium trade. They are piscivores and their prey includes the cichlid fish Variabilichromis moorii.

References

fasciatus
Fish described in 1898
Taxa named by George Albert Boulenger
Taxonomy articles created by Polbot